Burning times may refer to:

 In neopaganism, a term for the Witch trials in the Early Modern period
 The Burning Times, a 1990 documentary about the Early Modern European witchcraft trials
 Burning Times (album), an album by Christy Moore
 "Burning Times", a song by Iced Earth from the album Something Wicked This Way Comes
 "Burning Times", a song by Inkubus Sukkubus from the album Wytches
 "The Burning Times", a song by Testament from the album Demonic